IROC XI was the eleventh year of IROC competition, which took place in 1987. It saw the use of the Chevrolet Camaro in all races, the beginning of a long partnership with ABC/ESPN, and continued the format introduced in IROC VIII. Race one took place on the Daytona International Speedway, race two took place at Mid-Ohio, race three ran at Michigan International Speedway, and race four concluded the year at Watkins Glen International. Geoff Bodine won the championship and $191,900.

The roster of drivers and final points standings were as follows:

Race results

Race One, Daytona International Speedway
Friday, February 13, 1987

(5) Indicates 5 bonus points added to normal race points scored for leading the most laps.(3) Indicates 3 bonus points added to normal race points scored for leading the 2nd most laps(2) Indicates 2 bonus points added to normal race points scored for leading the 3rd most laps.

Average speed: Cautions: 3Margin of victory: 1 clLead changes: 5

Race Two, Mid-Ohio Sports Car Course
Saturday, June 6, 1987

(5) Indicates 5 bonus points added to normal race points scored for leading the most laps.(3) Indicates 3 bonus points added to normal race points scored for leading the 2nd most laps(2) Indicates 2 bonus points added to normal race points scored for leading the 3rd most laps (did not occur in this race so not awarded).

Average speed: 85.702 mphCautions: noneMargin of victory: 1.7 secLead changes: 1

Lap Leader Breakdown

Race Three, Michigan International Speedway
Saturday, August 1, 1987

(5) Indicates 5 bonus points added to normal race points scored for leading the most laps.(3) Indicates 3 bonus points added to normal race points scored for leading the 2nd most laps(2) Indicates 2 bonus points added to normal race points scored for leading the 3rd most laps (did not occur in this race so not awarded).

Average speed: 155.633 mphCautions: 1 (Lap 12, Dale Earnhardt crash)Margin of victory: .03 secLead changes: 6

Race Four, Watkins Glen International
Saturday, August 8, 1987

(5) Indicates 5 bonus points added to normal race points scored for leading the most laps.(3) Indicates 3 bonus points added to normal race points scored for leading the 2nd most laps (did not occur in this race so not awarded).(2) Indicates 2 bonus points added to normal race points scored for leading the 3rd most laps (did not occur in this race so not awarded).

Average speed: Cautions: noneMargin of victory: 2.02 secLead changes: 0

References

External links
IROC XI History - IROC Website

International Race of Champions
1987 in American motorsport